John "Jack" Capper (23 July 1931 – 10 March 2009) was a Welsh footballer.

Playing career
Capper turned professional with hometown club Wrexham in 1949, with his first appearance in The Football League coming against Grimsby Town in 1952–53.

When Capper left Wrexham in 1955 after 48 league outings he was awarded a benefit match. After a short spell with non-league Headington United, he returned to professional circles with Lincoln City in January 1956. After struggling to command a regular place at Sincil Bank, Capper moved to Chester in September 1959 for £1,500. He competed with the centre back position with George Spruce before retiring from the game through injury in 1961.

Capper later joined the Police and then as a security officer at a holiday camp in Prestatyn.

External links
Chester City obituary

References

1931 births
2009 deaths
Footballers from Wrexham
English Football League players
Welsh footballers
Association football defenders
Wrexham A.F.C. players
Oxford United F.C. players
Lincoln City F.C. players
Chester City F.C. players